Millionaire is the fifth studio album by Kevin Welch. Welch was backed by The Danes, a Copenhagen-based band, on this album. The album was Welch's fourth album for Dead Reckoning Records, the label founded by Welch in 1994 along with fellow musicians Kieran Kane, Mike Henderson, Tammy Rogers and Harry Stinson.

Critical reception

William Ruhlmann of AllMusic concludes his review with, "On earlier records, you yearned to hear what a real singer could do with his compositions, but on Millionaire he has come into his own as a performer."

John Kenyon of Pop Matters writes, "Welch's songwriting is as sharp as ever, and he continues to grow into his craggy voice. Few people hear his music, but for those of us who seek it out, Millionaire is another gem of a record."

Track listing

Musicians
Kevin Welch: Primary Artist, Vocals, Acoustic Guitar, Mando-Guitar, Background Vocals
Gustav Ljunggren: Lap Steel Guitar, Mando-Guitar, Mandolin, Mini Moog, Hammond Organ, Piano, Saxophone, Synthesizer, Trumpet, Wurlitzer, Background Vocals
Frank Birch Pontoppidan: Banjo, Engineer, Baritone Guitar, Electric Guitar, Mixing, Moog Bass, Electric Piano, Background Vocals
Frank Marstokk: Drums, Maracas, Moog Bass, Electric Piano, Synthesizer, Background Vocals
Fredrick Damsgaard: Bass, Electric Baritone Guitar, Background Vocals
Emil Carlsson: Violin
Kieran Kane: Mandolin
Claudia Scott: Background Vocals

Production
Kevin Welch: Producer
Frank Marstokk: Producer
Frank Birch Pontoppidan: Producer
Jan Eliasson: Mastering
John Hadley: Cover Painting
Angela Haglund: Design
Señor McGuire: Photography
Gorm Valentin: Photography
Philip Scoggins: Assistant Engineer

All track information and credits were taken from the album's liner notes.

References

External links
Kevin Welch Official Site
Dead Reckoning Records Official Site

2002 albums
Dead Reckoning Records albums
Kevin Welch albums